Prochola fuscula is a moth of the family Agonoxenidae. It is found in Puerto Rico.

References

Moths described in 1931
Agonoxeninae
Moths of the Caribbean
Taxa named by Henry Ogg Forbes